Tanel Kangert (born 11 March 1987) is an Estonian former road bicycle racer, who competed as a professional from 2008 to 2022.

Early life
Kangert was born in Vändra, Estonia. He attended kindergarten alongside fellow Estonian cyclist Rein Taaramäe.

Career
In the same year, he finished first in the Estonian National Time Trial Championships. However during 2008 he also suffered from severe pain in both of his knees, requiring surgery to allow them to move more naturally. This forced him to race as an amateur during the 2010 season.

In 2011, Kangert signed for the Kazakh team . In 2012, he won the final stage of the Tour de Suisse, beating Jérémy Roy in a sprint after the pair had attacked from a breakaway group earlier in the race. In the same year, he also won the Estonian National Road Race Championships. Kangert was one of Vincenzo Nibali's main domestiques in the 2013 Giro d'Italia, finishing in 14th position himself, after which it was announced he would sign a 3-year extension to his contract at Astana. In 2016, Kangert finished second in the Giro del Trentino, two seconds behind Mikel Landa, after winning the final stage. In October of the same year, he won the Abu Dhabi Tour ahead of Nicolas Roche.

Kangert signed for American outfit  for the 2019 season.

Major results

2004
 10th Overall Course de la Paix juniors
2005
 1st  Overall Course de la Paix juniors
 3rd Overall Liège–La Gleize
2006
 6th Overall Tour des Pyrénées
2007
 1st  Road race, National Under-23 Road Championships
 1st  Overall Tour du Gévaudan Languedoc-Roussillon
1st Stage 3
 2nd Kreiz Breizh Elites
 3rd Riga Grand Prix
 7th Time trial, UCI Under-23 Road World Championships
 8th Time trial, UEC European Under-23 Road Championships
 9th Overall Les 3 Jours de Vaucluse
 10th Coppa Placci
2008
 1st  Time trial, National Road Championships
 4th Boucles de l'Aulne
2010
 National Road Championships
1st  Time trial
2nd Road race
 1st Tartu GP
2011
 3rd Road race, National Road Championships
2012
 National Road Championships
1st  Road race
2nd Time trial
 1st Stage 9 Tour de Suisse
2013
 1st  Time trial, National Road Championships
 1st Stage 1 (TTT) Vuelta a España
 5th Grand Prix of Aargau Canton
 6th Overall Tour de Suisse
 9th Overall Tour de Pologne
2014
 5th Overall Vuelta a Andalucía
 9th Trofeo Serra de Tramuntana
2016
 1st  Overall Abu Dhabi Tour
1st Stage 3
 2nd Overall Giro del Trentino
1st Stages 1 (TTT), 3 & 4
 6th Vuelta a Murcia
 9th Road race, Olympic Games
2018
 1st  Time trial, National Road Championships
  Combativity award Stage 17 Tour de France
2019
 7th Time trial, UCI Road World Championships
2020
 2nd Faun-Ardèche Classic
 4th Overall Tour des Alpes-Maritimes et du Var
 8th Overall Paris–Nice
 9th La Drôme Classic
2021
 6th Overall Tour of Slovenia
2022
 2nd Time trial, National Road Championships
 10th Time trial, UEC European Road Championships

Grand Tour general classification results timeline

References

External links

 

1987 births
Living people
People from Vändra
Estonian male cyclists
Cyclists at the 2008 Summer Olympics
Cyclists at the 2016 Summer Olympics
Cyclists at the 2020 Summer Olympics
Olympic cyclists of Estonia
Tour de Suisse stage winners